The slight skink (Oligosoma levidensum) is a skink of the family Scincidae, endemic to the far north of the North Island of New Zealand.  The precise distribution is unknown; currently it is only known from localities in the Te Paki region of Northland. It closely resembles the copper skink, Oligosoma aeneum, and was considered to be a member of this species until recently when it was described as a new species using morphological, allozyme and DNA methods (Chapple et al. 2008). O. levidensum is difficult to distinguish morphologically from O. aeneum, which is probably why it had not been recognised until recently. The main distinguishing feature is the slighter overall body form of O. levidensum compared to O. aeneum. The limbs of O. levidensum are reduced compared to O. aeneum and O. hardyi, the other members of the O. aeneum complex.

Conservation status
As of 2012 the Department of Conservation (DOC) classified the slight skink as Nationally Vulnerable under the New Zealand Threat Classification System.

References

 Chapple, Patterson, Bell & Daugherty (2008). Taxonomic Revision of the Copper Skink (Cyclodina aenea, Squamata, Scincidea) Species Complex with descriptions of two new species. Journal of Herpetology 42 3 pp 437 – 452.

Reptiles of New Zealand
Oligosoma
Reptiles described in 2008
Taxa named by David G. Chapple
Taxa named by Geoff B. Patterson
Taxa named by Trent Bell
Taxa named by Charles H. Daugherty